Ghoveyleh-ye Sadat (also Romanized as Ghoveyleh-ye Sādāt; also known as Tall-e Qoveyleh and Tall Qaveyleh) is a village in Howmeh-ye Gharbi Rural District, in the Central District of Ramhormoz County, Khuzestan Province, Iran. At the 2006 census, its population was 316, in 61 families.

References 

Populated places in Ramhormoz County